Hallvard Gunnarssøn (c.1550 – 1608) was a Norwegian educator and author.

Gunnarsson was born at Sarpsborg in Østfold. He was a pupil at the Oslo Cathedral School and later was a student at the University of Rostock.  He was enrolled in 1566 and took his magister degree in 1572.  Later he also studied in Wittenberg. He lectured at the Oslo Cathedral School from 1577 until his death  in 1608.

Among his theological works is Isagoge, a shortened version of the Bible written in Latin hexameter style. He published several historical works written in Latin verses. His translation of a quiz book by the German priest Michael Saxe, first published in 1602, became very popular and was reissued several times.

References

External links 
 See entry of Hallvard Gunnarsson in the Rostock Matrikelportal

Year of birth unknown
1608 deaths
People from Sarpsborg
People educated at Oslo Cathedral School
University of Rostock alumni
Schoolteachers from Oslo
16th-century Norwegian historians
Norwegian non-fiction writers
16th-century Norwegian writers
Year of birth uncertain
17th-century Norwegian historians